Several ships of the British Royal Navy have been named HMS Audacious.

  was a 74-gun third rate in service from 1785 to 1815.
  was a  dreadnought battleship, launched in 1912 and sunk by a naval mine in October 1914.
The vessel was renamed HMS Eagle on 21 January 1946, two months before her launch on 19 March 1946.

A 14-gun sloop that  captured from France in 1798, Audacieux, was commissioned into the Royal Navy as HMS Audacieux.

Citations

References
 
 
 

Royal Navy ship names